Patricia Ojangole BCom, MBA, MPhil, PhD, FACCA, is a Ugandan accountant and bank executive. She is the chief executive officer of Uganda Development Bank, Uganda's only national development finance institution.

Education
She holds a Bachelor of Commerce degree awarded by Makerere University, in Kampala, Uganda's capital city. Her Master of Business Administration was received from the Eastern and Southern African Management Institute in Arusha, Tanzania. She is a Fellow of the Association of Chartered Certified Accountants of the United Kingdom. She is also a member of the Institute of Certified Public Accountants of Uganda and the Institute of Internal Auditors. As of May 2020, Patricia was pursuing a Doctorate degree in Finance. Her research focuses on "national development finance institutions, financial sector development and sustainable finance".

Career
Prior to joining UDB in 2012, Patricia Ojangole had worked for 13 years in various African countries including Kenya, Tanzania, Uganda, Namibia, Swaziland, Lesotho and Botswana. Her work had covered diverse business areas including credit, risk management and finance. She joined Uganda Development Bank Limited as Head, Internal Audit.

Controversy
On 30 November 2012, Ojangole was appointed as Chief Executive Officer at UDB. On 10 February 2014 a Magistrate in the Anti-Corruption Court ordered the arrest of Patricia Ojangole on two counts: (1) Alleged conflict of interest by her participation in the process that culminated in her selection as CEO and (2) Alleged victimization of a whistleblower. For several months, the case wound through Uganda's legal system.

Exonerated
On 30 June 2014, Judge Lawrence Gidudu of the Anti Corruption Court acquitted and discharged Ojangole of all the charges against her due to lack of incriminating evidence.  The judge noted that "the prosecution evidence was in support of Ms. Ojangole and therefore he had no option but to acquit". She continues to serve as the CEO at UDB.

See also
 Banking in Uganda
 Judiciary of Uganda

References

External links
Website of Uganda Development Bank

1977 births
Living people
Ugandan accountants
Fellows of the Association of Chartered Certified Accountants
Eastern and Southern African Management Institute alumni
People from Eastern Region, Uganda
Makerere University alumni
Ugandan Christians
Itesot people
Ugandan women chief executives